The 1992 Superbike World Championship was the fifth FIM Superbike World Championship season. The season started on 5 April at Albacete and finished on 25 October at Manfeild after 13 rounds.

Doug Polen won the riders' championship with 9 victories and Ducati won the manufacturers' championship.

Race calendar and results

Championship standings

Riders' standings

Manufacturers' standings

Superbike racing
Superbike World Championship seasons